Francisco Hernández Tomé (died 1872) was a Spanish mural painter who decorated the interiors of many churches and theatres in Madrid.

Among his works:
 San Isidro el Real
 Toledo Cathedral
 ceiling of the Teatro de la Zarzuela, destroyed by fire 1909

References

19th-century Spanish painters
19th-century Spanish male artists
Spanish male painters
Spanish muralists
1872 deaths
Year of birth missing